Sannex is a dansband from Sweden. The band was formed as a school project in 1977. In the mid-1980s, it was a six-man band, which invested in a professional career. In 1987, Sannex became the backing band for Ann-Louise Hanson, and in November 1987 became a full-time dance band, after working with Ann-Louise for five weeks at Restaurant Cabaret in Stockholm. They participated in Dansbandskampen in 2009. 

In 2013, the singer Andreas Olsson took over the band and they have since won, among other things, four Guldklavar in three years, also winning a Grammis. They have appeared in several TV programs, for example Allsång på Skansen in 2017 and 2018. They were in Melodifestivalen 2021 with "All Inclusive", but did not qualify to the finals.

Members
Andreas Olsson - vocals and guitar
Patrich Rundström - piano and vocals
Christian "Mini" Olsson - bas and vocals
Micke Norsten - drums and vocals

Former members
Roger Bergstrand - vocals, keyboard
Jonas Wennman - guitar, vocals, sax
Ronny Öberg - keyboard
Per-Håkan Helen - guitar, vocals
Lars Johansson - keyboard, vocals, sax
Jörgen Hållen - bas, vocals
Rickard Cox - drums
Björn Norbäck - drums
Tony Westland - vocals, keyboard, saxophone
Magnus Meinert - vocals and keyboard
Mattias Eklund - saxophone and keyboard
Johan Olsson - drums 
Chris Andersen - vocals and guitar
Hans Plahn - drums
Jenny Sahlén
Andreas "Lill-Klas" Andersson - bas, sax and vocals
Stefan Karlsson - piano, acoustic guitar and vocals

Discography

Albums
1990: Om du säger som det är
1993: Vem slår ditt hjärta för
1994: Kvällen är över
1994: Kärlekens klockor
1997: Mr Dee Jay
2001: Din i natt
2003: Angelina
2006: Live 2005
2006: Vem får följa med dig hem
2008: Live
2009: Live på sta'n
2011: Får jag lov
2012: Tillbaka till framtiden (peaked in Sweden at #5)
2014: Jag vill leva (peaked in Sweden at #4)
2015: Vill ni ha en till (live album)
2016: Din sida sängen (peaked in Sweden at #15)

Singles
1990: "I kärlekens namn"
1992: "Precis som Ferdinand"
1992: "Kvällen är över"
1993: "Tre tända ljus" 
1994: "Kärlekens spel"
1994: "Ge mig ljus"
1995: "Glöm inte bort varan"
1995: "Ge mig all din kärlek"
1997: "Höstens sista ros" 
1997: "Vem får dina kyssar i kväll" 
1999: "I kväll ska allting hända"
2000: "När sommaren vänder åter"
2000: "Ingen kan bli, som du"
2001: "Om du visste vad jag saknar dig"
2001: "Om jag bara vågar"
2001: "Ta emot min hand"
2002: "Angelina"
2003: "Cyberfriend"
2003: "Vi tänder ett ljus"
2004: "Stanna hos mig"
2006: "Jag är rädd för dig"
2006: "Vem får följa med dig hem"
2006: 'Julefrid"
2007: "När han kommer hem"
2008: "Försent för ett glas"
2008: "Här tillsammans"
2009: "Allt jag vill ha"

Charting songs in Svensktoppen

Others
1990: "I kärlekens namn"
2000: "Ingen kan bli som du"
2004: "Stanna hos mig"

References

External links
Official website

Dansbands
Melodifestivalen contestants of 2021